Hermann Zobel (25 July 1908 – 27 September 1995) was a Danish equestrian. He competed in two events at the 1956 Summer Olympics.

References

1908 births
1995 deaths
Danish male equestrians
Danish dressage riders
Olympic equestrians of Denmark
Equestrians at the 1956 Summer Olympics
Sportspeople from Copenhagen